The Black Rob Report is the second studio album by Black Rob. It was released on October 18, 2005, through Bad Boy.

A music video was made that starts with the first verse of "Star in da Hood" and then cuts to the full song "Ready".

Critical reception 

The Black Rob Report received generally positive reviews from music critics. K.B. Tindal of HipHopDX praised Rob for his rugged ghetto tales and chemistry with the featured artists, singling out former Da Band members Chopper and Ness on "Fire in da Hole" and "Team" as the standouts, concluding that "No shiny suits for this dude at all. He is Black Rob and you either love him or hate him but he will be a Bad Boy for life so don't get it twisted. He's here to stay." AllMusic's David Jeffries said that despite the album being marred by needless skits and interludes he praised the production and Rob's lyrics for bringing back the street cred missing from recent Bad Boy releases at the time, concluding that "The Black Rob Report still comes out on top courtesy of its freewheeling attitude, sharp beats, and charismatic rapper." Steve 'Flash' Juon of RapReviews said that despite Rob's limited lyrical content not matching his technical ability he praised the production for elevating the material, saying that "A few of these songs have hit potential, and if you like Rob's simple structure and lyrics that admittedly aren't playing themselves by acting like Rob is extra hard or the biggest gangster ever, then cop this joint." Hua Hsu of Blender singled out "Help Me Out" and "Ready" as the standouts of Rob's talents but found the rest of the album not as ear-grabbing, concluding that "Rob’s fiery, ballsy verses and jailhouse cred can’t overcome his plodding, forgettable hooks, which prevent him from becoming a star anywhere else."

Track listing

References

External links 
 The Black Rob Report (Official album site)
 Black Rob Report
 Free Black Rob

2005 albums
Black Rob albums
Bad Boy Records albums
Atlantic Records albums
Albums produced by Scram Jones
Albums produced by Mr. Porter
Albums produced by True Master